David Cordón Mesa (born 12 November 1975 in Madrid) is a Spanish retired footballer who played as a left back.

External links

1975 births
Living people
Footballers from Madrid
Spanish footballers
Association football defenders
Segunda División players
Segunda División B players
Tercera División players
Divisiones Regionales de Fútbol players
Atlético Madrid B players
Atlético Madrid footballers
Sevilla FC players
Recreativo de Huelva players
FC Cartagena footballers
SD Eibar footballers
CP Cacereño players
Zamora CF footballers
Pinatar CF players
CD Móstoles footballers
Real Unión footballers
Spain youth international footballers
Spain under-21 international footballers